Palma de Gandia is a municipality in the comarca of Safor in the Valencian Community, Spain.

The municipality of Palma de Gandia limited to the following locations: Ador, Alfauir, Beniarjó, Beniflà, Gandia, Potries, Real de Gandia and Ròtova, all in the province of Valencia.

References 

Municipalities in the Province of Valencia
Safor